Oyay Deng Ajak (born 16 October 1962) is a South Sudanese politician. He was formerly the Chief of Staff of the National Army, the Minister for Investment in the Cabinet of South Sudan as well as Minister of National Security. He was appointed to that position on 10 July 2011. 
In 2014, he was charged with attempting a coup against the Government of South Sudan, but the charges were suspended having been totally false and trumped up.
He is currently occupied in advocating for peace and responsible governance in South Sudan.

External links
Website of Government of South Sudan

See also
 SPLM
 SPLA
 Cabinet of South Sudan

References

Living people
Government ministers of South Sudan
1962 births